The Babes in the Wood Murders were the murders of two nine-year-old girls, Nicola Fellows and Karen Hadaway, on 9 October 1986, by a 20-year-old local roofer, Russell Bishop in Wild Park, Moulsecoomb, Brighton, Sussex, England. Bishop was tried and acquitted in 1987. The case remained open until 10 December 2018, when Bishop was found guilty of the murders in a second trial. The investigation into the two girls' murders is the largest and longest-running inquiry ever conducted by Sussex Police.

The murders became known as the Babes in the Wood murders after the children's tale.

Case 
Nicola Fellows and Karen Hadaway were best friends who lived close to each other on the Moulsecoomb estate in the north of Brighton but attended different schools. At around 3:30 p.m. on 9 October 1986 the two returned home from school before going out to play. At around 5 p.m. Susan Fellows saw her daughter and Hadaway playing with a roller boot, the last time she saw her daughter alive.

When seen by a 14-year-old acquaintance near a parade of shops in the Lewes Road area, the girls were told to go home as their parents would become worried. Fellows reportedly told Hadaway "Come on, let's go over to the park," referring to Wild Park, where they were not allowed. At around 6:30 p.m., the girls were seen near a police box on Lewes Road, near where Bishop was also seen wearing "what appeared to be a light blue top."

That same day Bishop had gone to Fellows's house to speak to a lodger who lived there. Fellows had told Bishop to go away and called his teenage girlfriend a "slag".

When the girls failed to return home by their bedtime their parents panicked. Hadaway's mother, Michelle, made a 999 call. A search party of around 200 police and neighbours was organised. A helicopter was brought in to help search Wild Park. Bishop joined the search, claiming his terrier, Misty, was a highly trained tracker dog and insured for £17,000. The bodies of the girls were found in Wild Park by searchers Kevin Rowland and his friend Matthew Marchant on the afternoon of 10 October 1986. The girls' bodies were found hidden in a makeshift den in the park. Both had been strangled and sexually assaulted.

Bishop fell under suspicion due to his close involvement in the search. When the bodies of the girls were found Bishop was close by and ran towards the scene with a police constable. However the officer recalled that Bishop did not get close enough even to see them properly. Bishop's story was littered with inconsistencies. He told detectives that on the evening in question he had gone to Moulsecoomb because he intended to steal a car from the nearby University of Sussex campus. He also claimed he had gone to a newsagent to buy a newspaper but realised he had no money.

Bishop told detectives he had planned to see his teenage girlfriend that evening but failed to turn up because he bought some cannabis and went home instead. He also tailored his story to fit the evidence, claiming he had felt the girls' necks for a pulse after finding them dead to explain any potential exchange of trace evidence. Owing to the series of inconsistencies Bishop was arrested on suspicion of murder on 31 October.

First arrest and trial in 1987
Bishop first became the centre of media attention in October 1986 when he was arrested on suspicion of the murders. However, he was acquitted on both rape and murder charges at his trial in December 1987 at Lewes Crown Court after two hours deliberation by the jury. Bishop was ultimately acquitted, and later sold his story as a wrongfully accused person to The News of the World for £15,000.

The acquittal was later attributed to a series of blunders in the prosecution's case. The pathologist and forensic investigation team failed to record the temperatures of the bodies and therefore could not accurately state a time of death. At the trial, the prosecution suggested the girls were killed between 6:15 p.m. and 6:30 p.m. Without scientific evidence to back up the time of the murders, the prosecution could not challenge Bishop's alibis on the night of the murders.

Though the girls were fatally strangled, neither measurements of hand marks around their necks nor fingerprints left by the strangler were taken. Forensic scientists did not analyse blood discovered on Hadaway's underwear. A key piece of the prosecution's case rested on the recovery of a blue Pinto brand sweatshirt. The top was found close to the railway line of Moulsecoomb station. Police believed Bishop discarded the top after attacking and killing the girls and were confident the clothing held a cache of forensic clues. The police did not properly preserve the evidence, allowing Bishop's defence team to cast doubt on the reliability of the material.

Under questioning, Bishop denied that the sweatshirt belonged to him, but his girlfriend, Jennifer Johnson, alleged the clothing was Bishop's. Prosecution hoped this would undermine Bishop's credibility and portray him as a liar who was trying to distance himself from a crucial piece of evidence. However, at the trial Johnson changed her story, telling the jury she had never seen the top before. Johnson also gave statements to defence counsel alleging that she had never made her witness statement confirming Bishop's ownership of the sweatshirt, and that it had been fabricated by the police and her initials forged.

The judge, Justice Schiemann, "directed the jury that unless they were sure first, that the girls were dead by 6:30 p.m. … they should acquit." The prosecution believed that the girls were killed between 5:15 p.m. and 6:30 p.m. However, witnesses stated they saw the girls alive at 6:30 p.m. and Bishop leaving Wild Park at 6:30 p.m.

Bishop was convicted in December 1990 of a similar attack on another Brighton girl. He was found guilty of the kidnapping, molestation and attempted murder of a 7-year-old girl in Whitehawk 10 months earlier and was sentenced to at least 14 years before eligibility for release.

Other suspects 
Nicola's father, Barrie Fellows, was arrested in 2009 at his home in Ellesmere Port, Cheshire, on suspicion of conspiracy to rape his daughter. Douglas Judd was also arrested on suspicion of rape. A spokeswoman for the Sussex Police said the investigation into sexual abuse allegations was unrelated to the ongoing murder inquiry, and both men were eventually released without charge.

Bishop's girlfriend later assaulted police when they arrested him for the subsequent attack following his murder acquittals, and told them the true killer was the father of one of the victims. This was later described by a judge as "a disgraceful and unfounded rumour started in The News of the World which [she was] happy to repeat" as he jailed her for lying at the original trial.

Legislative change and new evidence
Double-jeopardy rules had seemed to eliminate any possibility that Bishop might one day face a new trial for the murders, but new legislation in 2005 meant that a criminal could face a new trial for a crime if substantial new evidence came to light. In September 2006, the High Court decided that there was not enough evidence for Bishop to face a second trial for the murders.

Eurofins Forensic Services was engaged, the same forensics team that helped bring the killers of Stephen Lawrence to justice. Senior scientific adviser Roy Green at Eurofins was asked in August 2012 to re-examine the evidence and recovered a billion-to-one DNA match linking Bishop to the discarded sweatshirt. A taping from Hadaways's left forearm was also found to contain Bishop's DNA.

On 10 May 2016, however, a man, initially not named for legal reasons, was arrested. In May 2016, Bishop was removed from his cell at Frankland Prison in County Durham and taken to the local police station, where he was arrested for the murders of Hadaway and Fellows. In December 2017, the Court of Appeal ordered quashing the 1987 acquittals and called for a second jury trial for Bishop. On 2 February 2018, the Press Association reported that Bishop was to stand trial at the Old Bailey accused of the murder of the two girls killed in Brighton in 1986.
The trial was scheduled for 15 October 2018.
Bishop was charged and pleaded not guilty; on 10 December 2018, he was found guilty of murder.

2018 trial 
Prosecutor Brian Altman QC told the jury the case against Bishop was not just based on his attempt to kill another child in a similar manner, but on "other compelling evidence." He explained "significant part of the enquiry had been to re-evaluate various areas of scientific work that were performed for the purposes of the 1987 trial but through the lens of modern day techniques, DNA profiling which although available in 1986 and 1987 was then in its infancy."

The jury was told that in 2014 samples, taken from the left forearm of one of the victims in 1986, had been re-examined in the hope of finding traces of DNA. This yielded skin flakes which were subjected to ultra-modern profiling techniques, to produce a result that was one billion times more likely if Bishop's DNA was present than if it was absent.

Bishop suggested that Fellows's father, Barrie, was to blame, telling the jury the police spent "32 years building a case against the wrong man". Bishop was not in court every day for his nine-week trial and complained to the judge about feeling "suicidal" over his temporary stay at Belmarsh, requesting his return to Frankland.

At the 2018 trial, the prosecution put forward a different timeline. Altman presented evidence that the girls were alive at 6:30 p.m. and that Bishop returned to Wild Park. Defence witnesses at the 1987 trial returned as prosecution witnesses in 2018. At this trial, Altman argued the forensic samples taken as "tapings" in 1986 were so carefully handled by the police and preserved by scientists that he could present them as a "time capsule" to prove Bishop's guilt.

On 10 December 2018, after a nine-week trial, a jury of seven men and five women returned a guilty verdict after two-and-a-half hours of deliberation. On 11 December 2018, Bishop received two life sentences with a minimum of 36 years in prison.

Further criminal action
In May 2021, Jennifer Johnson, Bishop's girlfriend at the time of the murders, was found guilty of perjury and perverting the course of justice, having admitted she lied about the sweatshirt in the original trial. She was remanded in custody to await sentencing. On 19 May, Mr Justice Fraser sentenced Johnson to six years in prison, stating that her crimes were "at the most serious end of the scale". Johnson did not attend the sentence hearing, having refused to do so.

She is currently imprisoned in HMP Bronzefield, Britain's highest security prison for women.

Russell Bishop
Russell Bishop (9 February 1966 – 20 January 2022) was an English convicted child abductor, child molester and murderer, sentenced to life imprisonment for the murders of Fellows and Hadaway.

Former friend Geoff Caswell, who used to go fishing with Bishop, described him as a habitual liar. Caswell said, "He was a typical lad around town that time [1980s]. He'd grown a moustache and he had this car he'd race everywhere and he was always telling lies, trying to big himself up. He was only around 5' 5" tall and weighed around eight stone, and I think he suffered from 'little man syndrome'. He was always telling porkies about this and that. He was also a thief. He'd break into cars and he'd steal stuff. He had been a roofer but was going nowhere really."

Bishop died from cancer on 20 January 2022, at the age of 55. He had been rushed to hospital, from HMP Frankland in County Durham, after his condition deteriorated.

Early life
Bishop grew up in a family with his parents and his four brothers. His mother, Sylvia—an internationally renowned dog trainer—was described in court as "domineering". After educational problems and dyslexia, Bishop was sent away at age 15 to a special needs school, St Mary's Horam, in Maynard's Green, East Sussex. He ran away and hitchhiked home to Brighton. At the time of the murders of Nicola Fellows and Karen Hadaway, Bishop, who was 20 years old, was working as a roofer and living in a ground floor flat in the Hollingdean area of Brighton.

Criminal history
Bishop was fined £200 for burglary in 1984. He also stole car radios and hot-wired vehicles. Bishop also claimed to have been wrongly arrested on suspicion of involvement in the Brighton bombing. In 2018, The Independent reported that 'as even his own 2018 defence barrister admitted, in 1986 Russell Bishop was "a semi-literate, occasional, not very successful car thief … an occasional burglar."

1990 abduction
Bushop was convicted of the abduction, molestation, and attempted murder of a 7-year-old girl, Rachael Watts, in the Whitehawk area of Brighton. He committed this crime on 4 February 1990, and was sentenced on 13 December 1990. In 2005, there was debate over whether he should be classified as mentally ill.

Alleged links to Margaret Frame case

In 1991, criminologists Christopher Berry-Dee and Robin Odell had suggested a link in their book A Question of Evidence between the then still-unsolved Babes in the Wood case and the 1978 murder of Margaret Frame in Brighton. Frame, a 34-year-old woman described as a "young and vivacious mother", was raped and murdered in Stanmer Park less than half a mile from Wild Park. Berry-Dee and Odell noted that Frame's murder also occurred on a "cold October night" and happened eight years almost to the day before the 1986 Wild Park murders. They also observed that the murders had been committed in parks very close to each other in Brighton. 

At his 2018 trial, Bishop revealed that his father had been arrested for the Frame murder at the time, but not charged. Admitting this while claiming innocence of the 'Babes in the Wood' killings (before he was convicted), he claimed his father had been 'wrongly arrested'. He said that his father had accordingly told him to not "get involved" in the search for Fellows and Hadaway in 1986.

Frame had been walking her dog through the park after leaving Falmer Comprehensive School where she worked as a cleaner. She walked the route almost every day. On her way to Coldean Lane she was struck by a violent blow from an unidentified attacker in an unprovoked attack, before being stabbed through the heart and raped. The killer later returned to the scene, stripping her naked and dragging her body 500 yards away before burying her face down in a shallow grave and covering the grave with branches. Having disappeared on 12 October she was found ten days later by police searchers. The police long believed the killer was a local man, and the site she was found was less than half a mile from where the 'Babes in the Wood' were found. It was also only 500 metres (547 yards) away from where Bishop and his father lived on 46 Coldean Road, the road Frame also lived on and was walking to. Police believed the killer may have watched police searching areas of the park and then moved the body to a spot he thought police had already checked.

Frame's case remains unresolved.

Timeline 
9 October 1986: The girls go missing.
10 October 1986: The girls are found dead in Wild Park, Brighton.
 31 October 1986: Russell Bishop is first arrested in connection with the murders.
3 December 1986: Bishop is charged with the murders and remanded in custody to await trial during 1987.
10 December 1987: After a four-week trial, Bishop is acquitted of both murders and released.
4 February 1990: Bishop arrested and charged with the abduction, indecent assault, and attempted murder of a seven-year-old girl at Devil's Dyke, East Sussex three days prior. He is remanded in custody to await trial later in 1990.
13 December 1990: Bishop is convicted of kidnapping, indecent assault, and attempted murder. He is sentenced to life with a recommended minimum term of 14 years.
July 2002: Babes in the Wood case is subjected to review and DNA profiling, but was not a success.
April 2005: Double jeopardy laws are changed in Britain.
January 2006: Forensic tests link Bishop and the Pinto sweatshirt.
Autumn 2006: Families of both girls are informed that there was insufficient evidence to proceed with a fresh case against Bishop.
2011 to 2012: A cold-case review of the murders is conducted.
3 November 2013: A full re-investigation of forensics takes place.
10 May 2016: Bishop is rearrested.
December 2017: Bishop's acquittal is quashed.
10 December 2018: Bishop is convicted of the murders.
11 December 2018: Bishop is sentenced to life imprisonment with a recommended minimum term of 36 years.
17 May 2021: Jennifer Johnson, Bishop's girlfriend at the time of the murders, is found guilty of perjury.
19 May 2021: Johnson is sentenced to six years in prison. She is currently held at HMP Bronzefield, Britain's highest security prison for women.
20 January 2022: Russell Bishop dies of cancer, aged 55.

See also
David Smith – British man acquitted of a murder of a sex worker in 1993 only to go on to murder a prostitute in 1999
Michael Weir – British man who was the first person to be convicted of the same crime twice (following an original release on appeal)
Ernest Barrie – UK man acquitted on appeal after a Rough Justice 'miscarriage of justice' campaign, only to go on to kill a man
List of solved missing person cases

References

1980s missing person cases
1986 in England
1986 murders in the United Kingdom
20th century in East Sussex
Crime in Brighton and Hove
Deaths by strangulation
Female murder victims
Formerly missing people
Incidents of violence against girls
Missing person cases in England
Murdered English children
Murder in East Sussex
October 1986 crimes
October 1986 events in the United Kingdom
Rape in England